Kreiger is a surname. Notable people with the surname include:

Allison Kreiger (born 1983), American beauty queen
Johnny Kreiger (1901–1976), American racecar driver
Luis MacGregor Krieger (1918–1997), Mexican architect

See also
Krieger (disambiguation)
Kreuger